The 1993 Paris–Tours was the 87th edition of the Paris–Tours cycle race and was held on 6 October 1993. The race started in Saint-Arnoult-en-Yvelines and finished in Tours. The race was won by Johan Museeuw of the MG Maglificio team.

General classification

References

1993 in French sport
1993
Paris-Tours
October 1993 sports events in Europe
1993 in road cycling